The Tour is a 2008 Serbian film directed by Goran Marković. It was Serbia's official submission for the 2009 Academy Award for Best Foreign Language Film.

Plot
In December 1993, as the Bosnian War rages, Stanislav, an actor living in Belgrade, convinces members of a theater troupe to perform with him at the front lines. Desperate for money, the troupe, consisting of Miško, Sonja, Zaki, Lale, and Jadranka, accept the offer.

The troupe arrives at Srbobran (before and after the war known as Donji Vakuf), a town close to the front lines and occupied by the Army of Republika Srpska. The troupe puts on a satirical comedy performance which is booed. The local commander pressures them to hand over their earnings to a local Serb charity, and to stage a Serbian nationalist performance at the forward front-line to boost morale. This performance ends disastrously when Lale is beaten up by drunken soldiers.
Fed up with Stanislav over his false promises, the troupe decides to leave early but cannot locate their driver, Djuro. They trek through the surrounding combat zone looking for transportation, traversing a minefield in the process, but are captured by HVO militiamen. Sonja, a Croatian Serb, tries to fool the soldiers into thinking they are Croats by performing a scene from a Croatian nationalist piece, but their commander sees through their ruse. As the Croatian troops prepare to force them back across the minefield, a Serbian paramilitary unit (obvious reference to Arkan's Tigers) surrounds and captures the Croats. The troupe is forced to watch helplessly as the paramilitary commander (himself a devout fan of the actors) forces the captured soldiers to march to their deaths in the minefield.
Back at the town, Misko encounters and old friend from Belgrade, Ljubić. Ljubić offers to bring them along with him back to Belgrade the following day, and even provides them with accommodation at the local hotel. They are unceremoniously thrown out after a drunken Zaki insults the wife of the hotelier, Danilo. The troupe spend the night in Djuro's bus.
The next day, Ljubić, working as a propagandist, informs them that he must first deliver a speech to troops in Derventa. En route, Lale accosts Ljubić for espousing nationalist rhetoric, and tells him that the whole world recognizes the actions of the Serbs as evil. A scuffle ensues when Lale calls Ljubić a fascist, and Djuro loses control of the bus, which crashes in the middle of the forest. As they ponder their next move, they are surrounded by ARBiH soldiers. Ljubić is taken away to his presumed execution after the commander recognizes him from a nationalist speech he gave on television. After Jadranka performs a compelling monologue, the commander releases them.
The troupe finally return to Belgrade. They try to relax and enjoy a group dinner in their theater, but the awkward and unpleasant atmosphere remains.

Cast
Tihomir Stanić - Stanislav
Jelena Đokić - Jadranka
Dragan Nikolić - Miško
Mira Furlan - Sonja
Josif Tatić - Zaki	
Gordan Kičić - Lale
Slavko Štimac - Đuro
Vojislav Brajović - Ljubić
Sergej Trifunović - Leader of "Panthers", a Serb paramilitary commander
Emir Hadžihafizbegović - Danilo
Svetozar Cvetković - Hirurg (surgeon)
Branimir Popović - Bosniak commander
Bogdan Diklić - ZNG commander
Senad Bašić - General

External links
 

2008 films
Serbian war drama films
Bosnian War films
Films set in Bosnia and Herzegovina
Films set in Serbia
Films directed by Goran Marković
Films set in Belgrade
Films shot in Belgrade
Cultural depictions of Serbian women
Cultural depictions of Serbian men
Cultural depictions of Arkan